Ergosterol (ergosta-5,7,22-trien-3β-ol) is a sterol found in cell membranes of fungi and protozoa, serving many of the same functions that cholesterol serves in animal cells. Because many fungi and protozoa cannot survive without ergosterol, the enzymes that synthesize it have become important targets for drug discovery. In human nutrition, ergosterol is a provitamin form of vitamin D2; exposure to ultraviolet (UV) light causes a chemical reaction that produces vitamin D2.

Role in fungi
Ergosterol (ergosta-5,7,22-trien-3β-ol) is a sterol found in fungi, and named for ergot, the common name of members of the fungal genus Claviceps from which ergosterol was first isolated. Ergosterol is a component of yeast and other fungal cell membranes, serving many of the same functions that cholesterol serves in animal cells.
Its specificity in higher fungi is thought to be related to the climatic instabilities (highly varying humidity and moisture conditions) encountered by these organisms in their typical ecological niches (plant and animal surfaces, soil). Thus, despite the added energy requirements of ergosterol synthesis (if compared to cholesterol), ergosterol is thought to have evolved as a nearly ubiquitous, evolutionarily advantageous fungal alternative to cholesterol.This advantage could be linked to the presence of two conjugated double bonds in the structure (B-ring) of ergosterol giving it antioxidant properties.

Target for antifungal drugs

Because ergosterol is present in cell membranes of fungi, yet absent in those of animals, it is a useful target for antifungal drugs. Ergosterol is also present in the cell membranes of some protists, such as trypanosomes. This is the basis for the use of some antifungals against West African sleeping sickness.

Amphotericin B, an antifungal drug, targets ergosterol. It binds physically to ergosterol within the membrane, thus creating a polar pore in fungal membranes. This causes ions (predominantly potassium and hydrons) and other molecules to leak out, which will kill the cell. Amphotericin B has been replaced by safer agents in most circumstances, but is still used, despite its side effects, for life-threatening fungal or protozoan infections.

Fluconazole, miconazole, itraconazole, clotrimazole, and myclobutanil work in a different way, inhibiting synthesis of ergosterol from lanosterol by interfering with 14α-demethylase. Ergosterol is a smaller molecule than lanosterol; it is synthesized by combining two molecules of farnesyl pyrophosphate, a 15-carbon-long terpenoid, into lanosterol, which has 30 carbons. Then, two methyl groups are removed, making ergosterol. The "azole" class of antifungal agents inhibit the enzyme that performs these demethylation steps in the biosynthetic pathway between lanosterol and ergosterol.

Target for antiprotozoal drugs
Some protozoa, including Trichomonas and Leishmania are inhibited by drugs that target ergosterol synthesis and function

As a vitamin D2 precursor

Ergosterol is a biological precursor of vitamin D2, the chemical name of which is ergocalciferol. Exposure of white button mushrooms to UV-C irradiation at 0.403 mW per cm2 intensity from 30 cm distance produced time-dependent increases in vitamin D2 concentrations.

This happens naturally to a certain extent, and many mushrooms are irradiated after harvest to increase their vitamin D content. Fungi are also grown industrially so that ergosterol can be extracted and converted to Vitamin D for sale as a dietary supplement and food additive.

Preparations of irradiated ergosterol containing a mixture of previtamin and vitamin D2 were called viosterol in the 1930s.

Toxicity
Ergosterol powder is an irritant to skin, eyes, and the respiratory tract. Ingestion of large amounts can cause hypercalcemia, which (if prolonged) can lead to calcium salt deposits in the soft tissues and kidneys.

See also 
Mushrooms and vitamin D

References 

Sterols
Nutrition
Cell biology
Vitamin D